Croquis drawing is quick and sketchy drawing of a live model. Croquis drawings are usually made in a few minutes, after which the model changes pose or leaves and another croquis is drawn. The word croquis comes from French and means simply "sketch". A croquis is often an outline silhouette, for use by a designer.

After the initial sketch, croquis drawing can be used as a foundation for another work of art such as a painting or may be used as a work of art itself.

Advantages
The short duration of the pose benefits models because they do not need to keep still for a long time; this also benefits the artists because it helps them concentrate on the essential elements of the pose, or the most important parts of the drawing. An artist does not have time to draw all the details, so they learn to concentrate on the important elements. Croquis is also a good method of drawing subjects that generally do not stand still and pose, such as insects, animals, and children.

In fashion design
In fashion, the term refers to a quick sketch of a figure (typically nine heads tall as this is the accepted proportions for fashion illustration) with a loose drawing of the clothes that are being designed. Often a large number of croquis drawings will be created for one finished look, which is fully drawn and finished.

References

Drawing